The 1998 3 Nations Cup was a women's ice hockey tournament held in Finland from December 10–16, 1998. It was the third edition of the 3 Nations Cup.

Rosters

Results

Round robin

Statistics

Final standings

Scoring leaders
Only the top ten skaters, sorted by points, then goals, are included in this list.

Source: Hockey Canada

Goaltending leaders
The four goaltenders, based on save percentage, who played at least 40% of their team's minutes, are included in this list.

Source: Hockey Canada

External links
Tournament on hockeyarchives.info

1998
1998–99 in American women's ice hockey
1998–99 in Canadian women's ice hockey
1998–99 in Finnish ice hockey
1998–99 in women's ice hockey
1998-99
December 1998 sports events in Europe